ASpecialThing Records is a stand-up comedy record label started by Matt Belknap and Ryan McManemin.  Belknap was the creator of aspecialthing.com, an internet message board especially popular with West Coast comedy fans.  McManemin was an executive at Sony/MGM and longtime member of the message board.

Using the site as a launching pad, in late 2006 they announced to the web community that they would be starting their own record label, ASpecialThing Records. In February of the following year, comedian Jen Kirkman's Self Help was the first album released on the new label.

Podcasts 
In addition to making comedy albums, Belknap and McManemin are active podcast producers. Belknap produces and co-hosts Never Not Funny, the Jimmy Pardo Podcast, and with McManemin produces Doug Benson's Doug Loves Movies and Greg Proops's The Smartest Man in the World, among other shows.

Awards 
In 2017 ASpecialThing won the 2017 Grammy Award for Best Comedy Album and both McManemin and Belknap received award statues.  They also received certificates that stated that they were not to melt down their statues nor charge admission to see them.

Releases 
Jen Kirkman - Self Help
Jonah Ray - This Is Crazy Mixed Up Plumbing (7")
Never Not Funny: Volume One
Paul F. Tompkins - Impersonal
Scott Aukerman - Scott Aukerman's Koo Koo Roo's Greatest Hits
The Sklar Brothers - Sklar Maps
Doug Benson - Professional Humoredian
Andrew Daly - Nine Sweaters
R.O. Manse - R.O. Magic: The Best of R.O. Manse
Jimmy Pardo & Scott Aukerman - Never Not Christmas
Comedy By The Numbers© - Book-On-Tape CD!
Greg Proops - Elsewhere
Paul F. Tompkins - Freak Wharf
Comedy Death-Ray - Xmas CD 2009
Kyle Kinane - Death of the Party
Wayne Federman - The Chronicles of Federman (three volumes)
Greg Proops - Proops Digs In! (EP)
John Roy - "Alexander Hamilton"
Dan Telfer - Fossil Record (EP)
Paul F. Tompkins - Sir, You Have Fooled Me Twice (EP)
Comedy Death-Ray - Xmas CD 2010
Dave Hill - Let Me Turn You On
Paul F. Tompkins - You Should Have Told Me (DVD)
Jen Kirkman - Hail to the Freaks
Baron Vaughn - Raised By Cable
Jay Larson - Self-Diagnosed
WTF with Marc Maron: The First 100 Episodes
Jonah Ray - Hello, Mr. Magic Plane Person, Hello (10")
Dan Telfer - Tendrils of Ruin
Jim Hamilton - Poems About the Ocean
Michelle Biloon - You Can Be an Asshole
Brent Weinbach - Mostly Live
Nate Bargatze - Yelled At By a Clown
Jimmy Pardo - Sprezzatura
Mike Schmidt - The Big Angry
Bob Odenkirk and Brandon Wardell - Amateur Hour
Megan Koester - Tertium Non Datur

References

AST Records homepage
AST Radio
Jimmy Pardo's Podcast "Never Not Funny"

American record labels
Comedy record labels
2006 establishments in the United States
2000s in comedy
2010s in comedy